The  opened in Sapporo, Hokkaidō, Japan in 1977. The collection includes works by Jules Pascin and the École de Paris as well as by modern Japanese artists, in particular those with a connection to Hokkaidō.

There are five related prefectural art museums elsewhere in Sapporo and Hokkaidō: Migishi Kōtarō Museum of Art, Hokkaido, Hakodate Museum of Art, Hokkaido, Hokkaido Asahikawa Museum of Art, Hokkaido Obihiro Museum of Art, and Kushiro Art Museum, Hokkaido.

See also
 List of Cultural Properties of Japan - paintings (Hokkaidō)
 List of Historic Sites of Japan (Hokkaidō)
 Hokkaido Museum

References

External links

 Hokkaido Museum of Modern Art  
 Hokkaido Museum of Modern Art 

Museums in Sapporo
Art museums and galleries in Hokkaido
Prefectural museums
Museums established in 1977
1977 establishments in Japan